Mid Levels East  is one of the 15 constituencies in the Central and Western District.

The constituency returns one district councillor to the Central and Western District Council, with an election every four years. The seat was held by Ng Siu-hong of the Democratic Party.

Mids Levels East constituency is loosely based on the eastern part of the Mid-Levels in Central with estimated population of 16,508.

Councillors represented

1991–94

1994 to present

Election results

2010s

2000s

1990s

Notes

Citations

References
2011 District Council Election Results (Central & Western)
2007 District Council Election Results (Central & Western)
2003 District Council Election Results (Central & Western)
1999 District Council Election Results (Central & Western)

Constituencies of Hong Kong
Constituencies of Central and Western District Council
Central, Hong Kong
Mid-Levels
Constituencies established in 1991
1991 establishments in Hong Kong